Lucas Arnold Ker (born 12 October 1974) is an Argentine former professional tennis player.

Arnold Ker started playing tennis in the Olivos Tenis Club of Buenos Aires, under coach Malcolm Campbell. He is the younger brother of Patricio Arnold. He is right-handed and turned professional in 1994. He played several times for the Argentine Davis Cup team, where he made his debut in 1997 against Venezuela. Arnold Ker was Roger Federer's opponent in the latter's first professional match in 1998, beating the 17-year-old future singles world No. 1 and 20-time major singles champion in straight sets. Arnold Ker retired from professional tennis in 2016.

Cancer 
In August 2006, he was diagnosed with testicular cancer. The testicle was removed, and he successfully underwent chemotherapy. In 2008, he was in remission and returned to playing professional tennis.

ATP Tour career finals

Doubles: 33 (15 titles, 18 runner-ups)

ATP Challenger and ITF Futures finals

Singles: 5 (2–3)

Doubles: 28 (20–8)

Performance timelines

Singles

Doubles

Mixed doubles

References

External links 
 
 
 
 Lucas Learns To Live Again

1974 births
Living people
Argentine expatriate sportspeople in Spain
Argentine male tennis players
Argentine people of Scottish descent
Tennis players from Barcelona
Tennis players from Buenos Aires